The 2016–17 Ligas Regionales were the third tier of the Spanish women's football. With teams divided into groups by Autonomous Communities, only one team per group promoted to Segunda División.

Galicia

Top scorers

Asturias

Castile and León

Top scorers

Cantabria

Top scorers

Basque Country

Top scorers

Navarre

La Rioja 
There was not any promotion to Segunda División.

Top scorers

Aragon
Final stage

Catalonia

Top scorers

Balearic Islands
The top team was promoted to Segunda División.

Top scorers

Valencian Community
The top team was promoted to Segunda División.

Top scorers

References

3
Ligas Regionales (Spanish women's football)
Seasons in Spanish women's football competitions